Cleospira ochsneri is a species of small predatory sea snail, a marine gastropod mollusk in the family Pseudomelatomidae.

Description
The length of the shell attains 18 mm.

Distribution
This species occurs in the Pacific Ocean off Panama to Ecuador; also off the Galapagos Islands.

References

 Hertlein, Leo George, and A. M. Strong. "Eastern Pacific Expeditions of the New York Zoological Society." XXXIV. Mollusks from the west coast of Mexico and Central America. Part III. New York Zoological Society, Zoologica 31.2 (1946): 53-76

External links
 Sowerby I, G.B. (1834 ["1833"]). New species of shells collected by Mr. Cuming on the western coast of South America and among the islands of the South Pacific Ocean. Proceedings of the Zoological Society of London. 1: 134-139
 Gastropods.com: Cleospira ochsneri
 

ochsneri
Gastropods described in 1949